Night in the Park, Kiss in the Dark is the first full-length album by Canadian indie pop band Caveboy.

Track listing

Personnel 

 Michelle Bensimon – lead vocals, guitar, synth
 Isabelle Banos – synth, bass, backing vocals 
 Lana Cooney – drums, percussion, backing vocals, album layout and design
 Derek Hoffman - producer
 Kelly Jacob - album photos

See also
List of 2020 albums

References 

2020 debut albums